Novosergiyevka is a rural locality (a selo) and the administrative center of Novosergiyevsky District of Orenburg Oblast, Russia. Population:

References

Rural localities in Orenburg Oblast